Milandhoo (Dhivehi: މިލަންދޫ) is an island in the Shaviyani Atoll administrative division of the Maldives and geographically part of the Miladhummadulhu group in Thiladhunmati Atoll.

History
Milandhoo was uninhabited in 1997, when the Maldive's Minister of Atolls Abdulla Hameed launched a project to construct houses there and relocate residents from the neighboring island Maakandoodhoo, where the water had become contaminated. The resettlement was hastened in 2004, when the Boxing Day tsunami severely damaged Maakandoodhoo. The government officially recognized Milandhoo as an inhabited island on 20 March 2005. With more than 2140 residents, it is now the most populous island in Shaviyani Atoll.

Geography

Milandhoo is at 06°17′05″N 73°14′36″E in the southeast of Shaviyani atoll between Maakandoodhoo and Nalandhoo. Covering 126 hectares, Milandhoo is the largest island in the atoll.

Barracudas and a few other fish species also inhabit the lake, while crabs and hermit crabs live around its shore. Clay deposited at its center is used for traditional medicine. Bottle gourd plants, ironwood, sea hibiscus and mangroves are common nearby, while great morinda and coconut palm are rare.

In southwestern Milandhoo is a pond, Rayy Kulhi ("Red Pond"), so named because debris from bottle gourd plants and mangroves in the surrounding swamp redden its water. It is smaller and shallower than Sikundi Kulhi, but a popular picnic destination.

Demography

Economy

Agriculture

Farmers sell the plantains throughout Shaviyani Atoll and in Malé. Clearing for agriculture has been causing deforestation.

References

External links
https://web.archive.org/web/20101226010630/http://milandhoolive.net/
http://milandhoozuvaanun.wordpress.com/
 Milandhoo

Islands of the Maldives